The article contains information about the 2015–16 Iran 3rd Division football season. This is the 4th rated football league in Iran after the Persian Gulf Cup, Azadegan League, and 2nd Division. The league started from September 2015.

In total and in the first round, 60 teams will compete in 5 different groups.

First round

Promotion and Relegation:
Top two teams from each group will promote to second round.
Teams ranked 3rd & 4th in each group will play in first round of next season.
teams ranked 5th and below will relegate to provincial leagues

Group A

Group B

Group C

Group D

Group E

Second round
Promotion and Relegation:
Top two teams from each group (total: 6 teams) will promote to second division.
Teams ranked 3rd & 4th and two best placed 5th teams (total: 8 teams) will play in second round of next season.
Teams ranked 6th or below and the worst placed 5th team will play in first round of next season.

Group A

Group B

Group C

References 

League 3 (Iran) seasons
4